Samakh was a Palestinian Arab village at the south end of Lake Tiberias (the Sea of Galilee) in Ottoman Galilee and later Mandatory Palestine (now in Israel). It was the site of battle in 1918 during World War I.

Between 1905 and 1948, the town was an important stop on the Jezreel Valley railway and Hejaz railway, being the last effective stop in the British Mandate of Palestine (the station at al-Hamma was geographically isolated). It had a population of 3,320 Arab Muslims and Arab Christians in 1945.

The town's inhabitants fled after Haganah forces captured the town on 3 March 1948, and the remainder left in the wake of an assault by the Golani Brigade against the Syrian army on 18 April 1948. Most of the former residents became internally displaced refugees in the Arab city of Nazareth. Today, the Tzemah Industrial Zone and part of kibbutz Ma'agan are on the site of the former village.

Location
The village was on flat land in the Jordan Valley, on the southernmost shore of Lake Tiberias, only a short distance east of the point where River Jordan exits from the lake. Samakh was the largest village in the Tiberias district, both in terms of area and population, and was a major transportation link. The village was served by a station on the railroad line that ran on the Jezreel Valley railway, an extension of the Hejaz Railway. It lay on a highway that ran along the lake shore and led to the city of Tiberias in the northwest. Sailing routes on Lake Tiberias also linked Samakh with Tiberias's harbour.

History

Ottoman era
In the late Ottoman era, Pierre Jacotin named  the village Semak on his map from 1799. Most houses were built of adobe, but some were built of the black (basalt) stone that was abundant in the Golan area near Samakh. Johann Ludwig Burckhardt, a Swiss traveler to Palestine who saw the village (which he called Szammagh), in 1812, described it as a collection of thirty or forty mud houses alongside more costly houses built of black stone. He said about 100 faddans (1 fadda = 100–250 dunams) were cultivated in the immediate vicinity.

In 1838 Edward Robinson also found the village to contain 30-40 adobe huts, and a few built of black stone.

In 1875, Victor Guérin found the village to be divided into two parts, and built of adobe  bricks or volcanic stones. In 1881, the PEF's Survey of Western Palestine described it as a village of  200 inhabitants who cultivated the surrounding plain.

G. Schumacher, who visited the site in 1883, described the village as being inhabited mostly by people who immigrated there from Algiers.

Samakh was the location of one of the first airfields in Palestine, built by the Turks (with German assistance) in 1917 for military use.

Battle of Samakh

The village and its railway station were the site of a battle between British/Australian and German/Turkish forces in World War I. The battle ended in an Allied victory and opened up the way to Damascus for General Allenby's troops. It was described by Field Marshal Wavell as the most fierce and cruel battle in the Palestinian theater.

British Mandate era

1920 events

Growth
In the 1922 census of Palestine, conducted  by the British Mandate authorities, Samakh, together with Al-Hamma, had a total population of 976. Of these, 922 were Muslims, 28 Jews, one follower of the Baháʼí Faith and 25 Christians; where the Christians were 6 Orthodox, 1 Roman Catholic, 2 Melkite, 11 Armenian and 5 Anglican. In the 1931 census the population had increased to 1900; 4 Druse, 76 Christians, 40 Jews and 1780 Muslims, in  a total of 480 houses.

In 1923 a local council was created, which still administered Samakh by  1945. The council's expenditure grew steadily, from P£310 in 1929 to P£1,100 in 1944.

In 1929–1935, the airfield in Samakh was used for Imperial Airways passenger services as a stop en route to Baghdad and further to Karachi. Difficult weather conditions in the area led to destruction of a Hannibal aircraft, and to relocation of the passenger services to Gaza.

In the 1944/45 statistics, the population of Samakh had increased to 3,320 Muslims, 130 Christians and 10 of other faiths, a total of 3,460 persons. The majority of the population belonged to the settled Bedouin tribes of the 'Arab al-Suqur and 'Arab al-Bashatiwa. The village had two schools, one for boys and another for girls. Their chief crops were bananas and grain; in 1944/45 8,523 dunums were planted in cereals, while 239 dunams were built-up (urban) land.

1948 events
The village was captured by the Haganah in the 1947–1948 Civil War in Mandatory Palestine, along with the British border guard base nearby, and became a military outpost.

Israeli period
Samakh that changed hands twice in the Battles of the Kinarot Valley, between the Haganah and the Syrian Army. On May 21, 1949, after the Syrian retreat, the Haganah set up a position in Samakh.

Walid Khalidi wrote in 1992, that the structure remaining of Samakh was the ruins of the railway station and a water reservoir. The members of Degania Alef kibbutz built a public park, a petrol station, and factories known as the Tzemah Factories on the village site. The Kinneret College is also located there.

The kibbutzim Masada and Sha'ar HaGolan were established southeast of the village site in 1937, and have since expanded onto lands within Samakh's former jurisdiction. Both Ma'agan and the nearby kibbutz Tel Katzir were built on Samakh's land in 1949. The kibbutzim Deganya Alef and Deganya Bet are also close to Samakh's location, but not on land that belonged to the village.

The Tzemah road junction, between Highway 90, 92 and 98, is next to the site of Samakh; near it are a small water park and a Burger Ranch restaurant.

See also
Depopulated Palestinian locations in Israel

References

Bibliography

 
 
 
 

 
 
 

 (pp. 132, 177, 186, 260, 269, 372)

External links
Welcome to Samakh
Samakh,  Zochrot
Survey of Western Palestine, Map 6: IAA, Wikimedia commons
Samakh, from the Khalil Sakakini Cultural Center
Samakh Railway Station

Arab villages depopulated prior to the 1948 Arab–Israeli War
District of Tiberias
Sea of Galilee